The 1954 Boston College Eagles football team represented Boston College as an independent during the 1954 college football season. In its fourth season under head coach Mike Holovak, the team compiled an 8–1 record and outscored opponents by a combined total of 196 to 74.

The team played its home games at Fenway Park in Boston.

Schedule

References

Boston College
Boston College Eagles football seasons
Boston College Eagles football
1950s in Boston